Getulio Joaquín Vaca Diez Parada (born 24 October 1984) is a Bolivian former professional footballer who played as a midfielder. He made two appearances for the Bolivia national team in 2004. He was also part of Bolivia's squad for the 2004 Copa América tournament.

Career
In summer 2005, Vaca Diez joined Swiss club Yverdon-Sport, newly promoted to the Swiss Super League, on loan.

References

External links
 

1984 births
Living people
Sportspeople from Santa Cruz de la Sierra
Bolivian footballers
Association football midfielders
Bolivia international footballers
Swiss Super League players
Club Deportivo Guabirá footballers
Club Bolívar players
Club Blooming players
Yverdon-Sport FC players
Universitario de Sucre footballers
Municipal Real Mamoré players
Bolivian expatriate footballers
Bolivian expatriate sportspeople in Switzerland
Expatriate footballers in Switzerland